A pivot gun was a type of cannon mounted on a fixed central emplacement which permitted it to be moved through a wide horizontal arc. They were a common weapon aboard ships and in land fortifications for several centuries but became obsolete after the invention of gun turrets.

History 
By mounting a cannon on a pivot, a much wider arc of fire could be obtained than was possible with conventional carriage-mounted cannons. Unlike the latter, however, pivot guns were fixed in one place and could not easily be moved outside of their horizontal arc; they could thus only really be used in fixed positions such as in a fort or on a battleship.

There was no standard size of pivot gun, though they tended to be fairly substantial weapons. Like other cannons, they were usually muzzleloaders and could fire either shells or grapeshot (or other types of shot). Their calibers ranged from a few inches to the giant 11-inch Dahlgren guns used by the United States Navy in the mid-19th century. 

Pivot guns had a major disadvantage in warfare: they were very difficult to protect in battle and were necessarily very exposed, as they lay close to the surface of a ship's deck and required an open field of view. In the late 19th century they were replaced by "disappearing guns" and ultimately by turrets, which enabled a broad arc of fire while providing the gunners with all-round protection from incoming fire.

Pivot guns should not be confused with swivel guns, a much smaller type of ordnance.

Gallery 

Naval artillery

See also 

 Apilan and kota mara
 Chase gun
 History of gunpowder
 Naval artillery in the Age of Sail
 Naval tactics in the Age of Sail

External links 

 Sailing ship armaments